Denmark competed at the 1908 Summer Olympics in London, England.  No Danish athletes had competed in the 1904 Summer Olympics.

Medalists

Results by event

Athletics

Boxing

2 Danish boxers competed in the lightweight class, with each losing his first bout.

Fencing

Football

Denmark was represented by the Denmark national football team.

Gymnastics

Shooting

Swimming

Wrestling

Sources
 
 
 

Nations at the 1908 Summer Olympics
1908
Olympics